Electric City is a city in Grant County, Washington. The population was 956 at the time of the 2020 census. The community was named for its proximity to the power source at Grand Coulee Dam.

History

Electric City was established in 1934 as one of several settlements around the future site of the Grand Coulee Dam that aimed to house construction workers. President Franklin D. Roosevelt stopped at Electric City during his tour of the dam site later that year; by August, 500 lots had been platted for the town. Some of the earliest buildings in Electric City had been relocated from nearby Osborne, which was inundated by Franklin D. Roosevelt Lake following the dam's completion. A post office was created for the settlement in June 1935 and was followed by a school a year later.

Electric City was incorporated as a fourth-class city on August 4, 1950, following a vote on July 8. The 1950 U.S. census counted a population of 1,472 people in the Electric City area a few months before the election. A group of residents contested the validity of the incorporation and appealed to the Grant County's superior court, which did not overturn the incorporation.

Geography

Electric City is located near the northern end of the Grand Coulee (now filled by Banks Lake) in northern Grant County, Washington. It is southwest of the Grand Coulee Dam and the city of Grand Coulee, and connected to both by State Route 155.

Climate

Demographics

2010 census
As of the census of 2010, there were 968 people, 447 households, and 275 families residing in the city. The racial makeup of the city was 86.0% White, 0.5% African American, 5.2% Native American, 0.4% Asian, 0.9% from other races, and 7.0% from two or more races. Hispanic or Latino of any race were 4.0% of the population.

There were 447 households, of which 21.3% had children under the age of 18 living with them, 50.1% were married couples living together, 8.9% had a female householder with no husband present, 2.5% had a male householder with no wife present, and 38.5% were non-families. 33.3% of all households were made up of individuals, and 13.6% had someone living alone who was 65 years of age or older. The average household size was 2.17 and the average family size was 2.71.

The median age in the city was 50.5 years. 18.3% of residents were under the age of 18; 5% were between the ages of 18 and 24; 18.1% were from 25 to 44; 36.4% were from 45 to 64; and 22.2% were 65 years of age or older. The gender makeup of the city was 49.7% male and 50.3% female.

2000 census
As of the census of 2000, there were 922 people, 382 households, and 291 families residing in the city. The population density was 1,706.3 people per square mile (659.2/km2). There were 420 housing units at an average density of 777.3 per square mile (300.3/km2). The racial makeup of the city was 89.59% White, 0.22% African American, 7.05% Native American, 0.65% Asian, 0.11% Pacific Islander, 0.11% from other races, and 2.28% from two or more races. Hispanic or Latino of any race were 1.84% of the population.

There were 382 households, out of which 27.0% had children under the age of 18 living with them, 63.6% were married couples living together, 8.1% had a female householder with no husband present, and 23.8% were non-families. 20.2% of all households were made up of individuals, and 7.3% had someone living alone who was 65 years of age or older. The average household size was 2.41 and the average family size was 2.74.

In the city, the age distribution of the population shows 23.1% under the age of 18, 6.1% from 18 to 24, 18.4% from 25 to 44, 33.9% from 45 to 64, and 18.4% who were 65 years of age or older. The median age was 46 years. For every 100 females, there were 92.9 males. For every 100 females age 18 and over, there were 95.3 males.

The median income for a household in the city was $42,321, and the median income for a family was $47,969. Males had a median income of $46,667 versus $20,288 for females. The per capita income for the city was $19,388. About 11.6% of families and 12.4% of the population were below the poverty line, including 18.0% of those under age 18 and 9.5% of those age 65 or over.

Notable people
Dennis Oppenheim, artist

References

Cities in Grant County, Washington
Cities in Washington (state)
Populated places in the Okanogan